A fudge cake is a chocolate cake containing fudge. It is commonly eaten at celebrations, parties, or gatherings.

Varieties
Variations include pudding fudge cake, made with chocolate cake mix, chocolate pudding, and chocolate chips. When made with additional chocolate, the recipe is sometimes known as "Death by Chocolate".

"Fudge cake" is also a term in the American South to refer to a dense, single-layer chocolate cake served with or without icing.  It is similar to a brownie, although more moist with more chocolate.

See also

 Molten chocolate cake
 List of desserts

References

External links
Fudge cake recipe from Cadbury
"Tunnel of Fudge Cake" recipe from Pillsbury
"Tunnel-Of-Fudge" recipe from The New York Times

Chocolate desserts
American cakes